Caravaca Club de Fútbol was a Spanish football team based in Caravaca de la Cruz, in the Region of Murcia. Founded in 1969 and dissolved in 2011, it held home games at Estadio Antonio Martínez El Morao, with a capacity of 2,000 spectators.

History
Caravaca Club de Fútbol was founded in 1969 (after previous denominations as Deportiva Caravaqueña and Caravaca Football Club), first reaching Tercera División in 1980, and lasting six seasons.

The club returned to level four in 1991, consolidating in that division in the following decades; in the 2008–09 season, Caravaca led all teams in the group at 115 goals scored and, after defeating CD Ourense in the promotion playoffs, its first promotion to level three.

After the 2010–11 season, the club was forced to dissolve due to economic problems, and its place was bought by CF La Unión.

Season to season

2 seasons in Segunda División B
24 seasons in Tercera División

Last squad (2010–11)

Famous players
  Fernando Obama
  Iván Zarandona
 Antonio Martín
 Juan Antonio Chesa

External links
Official website 
Futbolme team profile 

 
Association football clubs established in 1969
Association football clubs disestablished in 2011
Defunct football clubs in the Region of Murcia
1969 establishments in Spain
2011 disestablishments in Spain